Aquilino Coppini (died 1629) was an Italian musician and lyricist. While in the service of Cardinal Federico Borromeo, he specialized in creating sacred contrafacta of secular madrigals. His contrafacta are of interest for their concentration on Monteverdi's madrigals (especially the third, fourth and fifth books) and for the form in which he treats the poetic text. According to Antonio Delfino, "rather than simply replacing the original text with a liturgical one, he ‘spiritualized’ then through a careful translation which, like an exercise in rhetorical expertise, reproduces the phonemes, accents and rhythms of the secular text." In a letter to Hendrik van den Putten published in Epistolarum libri sex (1613), Coppini says that "the Monteverdi pieces need longer pauses, resting occasionally, allowing retardation, and at times even pressing on. There is in them a wonderful power to move the passions exceedingly."

Publications
Musica tolta da i madrigali di Claudio Monteverde, e d'altri autori … e fatta spirituale, a cinque, et sei voci, Milan, 1607
Il secondo libro della musica di Claudio Monteverde, e d'altri autori à 5, Milan, 1608 (lost)
Il terzo libro della musica di Claudio Monteverde a cinque voci fatta spirituale da Aquilino Coppini, Milan, 1609
Ticinense Gymnasio Artis Oratoriae Regij Imperatoris Epistolarum libri sex, Milan, 1613

References

External links

Italian classical musicians
Baroque musicians
Italian lyricists
Year of birth missing
1629 deaths